Karusellen may refer to:

 Karusellen (song), also known as Jungfru skär.
 Karusellen (radio programme) – led by Lennart Hyland.
 Carousel (1923 film), Swedish 1923 film directed by Dimitri Buchowetzki